William Alexander (16 July 1874 – 1 November 1937) was a Welsh international rugby union prop who played club rugby for Llwynypia.

Club career
Alexander began his club rugby days with local rugby team Glynneath, but later moved to Rhondda team Llwynypia. Although an unfashionable second-tier club, Llwynypia provided several international caps around the turn of the century as the 'Rhondda forward' gained acceptability into the Welsh pack. Alexander as a strong prop forward was first selected to represent Wales in the 1898 Home Nations Championship in a game against Ireland, under the captaincy of Billy Bancroft. After a strong Welsh win, Alexander retained his position for the last game of the campaign against England.

Alexander was back for all three matches of the 1899 Championship, which saw Wales demolish England in the opening game at St Helens, but then slip away in the later two encounters against Scotland and Ireland. Alexander missed the 1900 Championship, but played the last two games of the 1901 tournament. These would be his very last internationals, but he finished on a successful note with a clean win against the Irish. Alexander scored his only international points in the Ireland game with two tries. The match is noted as a transition game which saw the end of an older generation, with not only Alexander but also Bancroft playing his last game, and the introduction of future Welsh heroes Rhys Gabe, Dicky Owen and Dick Jones.

International games played
Wales
  1898, 1899
  1898, 1899, 1901
  1899, 1901

Bibliography

References

1874 births
1937 deaths
Ferndale RFC players
Glamorgan Police RFC players
Glynneath RFC players
Llwynypia RFC players
Rugby union players from Glynneath
Rugby union props
Wales international rugby union players
Welsh police officers
Welsh rugby union players
Glamorgan Police officers